Chavuma Falls is a small waterfall on the Zambezi River in northwestern Zambia close to the border with Angola and the town of Chavuma. During the wet season the waterfalls are generally overwhelmed by the flow of the river but become visible as the dry season progresses. The falls have a mean annual discharge of 555 m3/s and are only a few meters high. In 2018, Zambia proposed to develop a hydroelectric power station at Chavuma Falls to boost energy production and stimulate economic activities in the area.

References

Waterfalls of Zambia
Zambezi River
Geography of North-Western Province, Zambia